Wolfgang Graßl (January 11, 1970 – April 12, 2010 in Berchtesgaden) was a German skier, coach and businessman, who represented Germany on the junior level in the 1980s.  He died of heart failure.

References
Obituary

1970 births
2010 deaths
German male alpine skiers